Mademoiselle Josette, My Woman (French: Mademoiselle Josette ma femme) is a 1950 French comedy film directed by André Berthomieu and starring Odile Versois, Fernand Gravey and Robert Arnoux. It is based on the 1906 play of the same title by Robert Charvay and Paul Gavault which Berthomieu had previously made into a 1933 film Mademoiselle Josette, My Woman.

The film's sets were designed by Raymond Nègre.

Cast
 Odile Versois as Josette Dupré 
 Fernand Gravey as André Ternay 
 Robert Arnoux as Panard  
 Jean Berton as Le directeur de cabinet  
 Charles Bouillaud as Le portier  
 Rivers Cadet as Monsieur Dutilleul  
 Jacques Essy 
 Paul Faivre as Urbain  
 Suzanne Guémard as Madame Dupré  
 Marcelle Hainia as Madame Dutilleul 
 Harry-Max as Le fondé de pouvoirs 
 Charles Jarrel as Joe Jackson 
 Georges Lannes as Monsieur Dupré  
 Marcel Meral as Le valet  
 Marcel Mérovée as Le caddie  
 Guy Rapp as Le directeur de l'hôpital  
 Marcelle Rexiane as Léontine  
 Lysiane Rey as Myrianne  
 André Versini as Vallorbier

References

Bibliography 
 James L. Limbacher. Haven't I seen you somewhere before?: Remakes, sequels, and series in motion pictures and television, 1896-1978. Pierian Press, 1979.

External links 
 

1950 films
French comedy films
1950 comedy films
1950s French-language films
Films directed by André Berthomieu
French films based on plays
Remakes of French films
French black-and-white films
1950s French films